Nikhil Kumar Choudhary (born 6 December 1949) is an Indian politician, who was a member of the 13th, 14th and 15th Lok Sabha representing the Katihar constituency of Bihar, and is a member of the Bharatiya Janata Party. He was a Minister of State in the National Democratic Alliance government.

References

External links
 Home Page on the Parliament of India's Website

1948 births
Living people
India MPs 2004–2009
India MPs 2009–2014
Lok Sabha members from Bihar
People from Katihar
India MPs 1999–2004
National Democratic Alliance candidates in the 2014 Indian general election
Bharatiya Janata Party politicians from Bihar